Larry Sheets (born May 11, 1943) is an American politician who represented Iowa's 80th district in the Iowa House of Representatives.  A Republican, he served from 2013 to 2019.

References

Living people
1943 births
Republican Party members of the Iowa House of Representatives
Farmers from Iowa
Engineers from Iowa
21st-century American politicians
20th-century American engineers
21st-century American engineers
People from Moulton, Iowa
People from Hammond, Indiana